USS Pinola was a  built for the Union Navy during the American Civil War.

Service history
The Pinola  was launched on or about 3 October 1861, commissioned on 29 January 1862 under the command of Lieutenant Peirce Crosby and soon left for the Gulf of Mexico, her station for more than three years of Civil War service.

In April 1862, Pinola played an active role in the campaign that led to the capture of New Orleans and was damaged while running past the fortifications below that city during the Battle of Forts Jackson and St. Philip. One of her sailors, Gunner's Mate John B. Frisbee, was awarded the Medal of Honor for his actions during the battle. In months that followed, she was employed on the lower Mississippi. On 28 June 1862, Pinola was one of the ships that successfully steamed past the batteries at Vicksburg, and passed them again headed down stream on 15 July.

During 1863-64, Pinola served on the blockade off Mobile Bay, Alabama. She was similarly engaged off the coast of Texas during the last months of the war. During her years in the Gulf, Pinola captured two blockade runners and destroyed a third. Decommissioned in July 1865, Pinola was sold the following November. She was subsequently converted to a sailing merchant bark.

See also

Union Blockade

References

External links
  Naval Historical Center Photos

 

Ships of the Union Navy
Ships built in Baltimore
Steamships of the United States Navy
Unadilla-class gunboats
American Civil War patrol vessels of the United States
1861 ships